Philodina is a genus of rotifers belonging to the family Philodinidae.

The genus has cosmopolitan distribution.

Species:
 Philodina acuticornis Murray, 1902 
 Philodina alata Murray, 1910

References

Bdelloidea
Rotifer genera